Anti-Judaism describes a range of historic and current ideologies which are totally or partially based on opposition to Judaism, on the denial or the abrogation of the Mosaic covenant, and the replacement of Jewish people by the adherents of another religion, political theology, or way of life which is held to have superceded theirs as the "light to the nations" or God's chosen people.   The opposition is maintained by the appropriation and adaptation of Jewish prophecy and texts, and the stigmatization of the very people who transmitted those texts.  There have been Christian, Islamic, nationalistic, Enlightenment rationalist, and socio-economic variations of this theme, according to Nirenberg.

There are three types of Anti-Judaism according to Douglas Hare: (1) Prophetic Anti-judaism - the criticism of the beliefs and religious practices of the religion; (2) Jewish-Christian anti-Judaism - Jews who believe that Jesus is the Messiah; and (3) Gentilizing anti-Judaism - emphasis on the gentile character of the new movement and claiming god's rejection of the "old" Israel.  Most scholarly analyses appear concerned with the phenomenon described by his third defintion. 

According to Langmuir, it is based on "total or partial opposition to Judaism as a religion—and the total or partial opposition to Jews as adherents of it—by persons who accept a competing system of beliefs and practices and consider certain genuine Judaic beliefs and practices inferior."  

As the rejection of a particular way of thinking about God, anti-Judaism is distinct from antisemitism but historically, it has also encouraged the development of racial antisemitism, a racist ideology which was articulated in the 19th century. Some scholars have found intersections between theology and racism and as a result, they have coined the term religious antisemitism.

Other examples of anti-Judaism include the Islamic doctrine of tahrif and other forms of enmity, and Marx's formulation of anti-capitalism which types capitalists as "essentially Jewish" and therefore evil.

Pre-Christian Roman Empire

In Ancient Rome, religion was an integral part of the civil government. Beginning with the Roman Senate's declaration of the divinity of Julius Caesar on 1 January 42 BC, some Emperors were proclaimed gods on Earth, and demanded to be worshiped accordingly throughout the Roman Empire. This created religious difficulties for those Jews, monotheistic, who adhere strictly to their customary law, and worshipers of Mithras, Sabazius and early Christians. At the time of Jesus' ministry, the Jews of the Roman Empire were a respected and privileged minority whose influence was enhanced by a relatively high level of literacy. The Jews were granted a number of concessions by the Romans (the right to observe the Sabbath and to substitute prayers for the emperor in place of participation in the imperial cult). They had been exempted from military service on the Sabbath, for example. Julius Caesar, who never forgot the debt he owed to Antipater the Idumaean for playing a decisive role in the Battle of Pelusium and thereby saving his life and career, was supportive of Jews, allowing them uniquely a right to assembly and to collect funds for Jerusalem. His enmity toward Pompey, who had conquered Jerusalem and defiled the Holy of Holies, enhanced his status among them, as he ordered the reconstruction of the walls of Jerusalem after the destruction wrought by Pompey. He may also have cultivated Jews as clients to buttress his position in the East against the latter. At times he treated the high priest Hyrcanus II on equal terms by writing to him as Rome's pontifex maximus. Jews reacted to his assassination by mourning him publicly in Rome.

The crisis under Caligula (37–41) has been proposed as the "first open break between Rome and the Jews", even though problems were already evident during the Census of Quirinius in 6 and under Sejanus (before 31).

After the Jewish-Roman wars (66–135), Hadrian changed the name of Iudaea province to Syria Palaestina and Jerusalem to Aelia Capitolina in an attempt to erase the historical ties of the Jewish people to the region. Although this idea has been pointed out as a mere assumption, with no basis in historical sources, according to other scholars.  After 70, Jews and Jewish proselytes were only allowed to practice their religion if they paid the Jewish tax, and after 135 were barred from Jerusalem except for the day of Tisha B'Av. Frequent Jewish uprisings (two major wars in 66–73 and 133–136 CE, in addition to uprisings in Alexandria and Cyrene), xenophobia, and Jewish prerogatives and idiosyncrasies, were at the root of anti-Jewish feelings in some segments of Roman society. These confrontations did cause temporary erosions in the status of the Jews in the empire. Reversals in the relationship were temporary and did not have permanent or sustained impact.

Flavius Clemens was put to death in 95 CE for "living a Jewish life" or "drifting into Jewish ways", an accusation also frequently made against Early Christians, and which may well have been related to the administration of the Jewish tax under Domitian.

The Roman Empire adopted Christianity as its state religion with the Edict of Thessalonica on 27 February 380.

Christian anti-Judaism

Early Christianity and the Judaizers

Christianity commenced as a sect within Judaism, known as Jewish Christianity. It was seen as such by the early Christians, as well as Jews in general. The wider Roman administration most likely would not have understood any distinction. Historians debate whether or not the Roman government distinguished between Christians and Jews before 96 CE, when Christians successfully petitioned Nerva to exempt them from the Jewish tax (the Fiscus Judaicus) on the basis that they were not Jews. From then on, practising Jews paid the tax while Christians did not. Christianity is based on Jewish monotheism, scriptures (generally the Greek Old Testament or Targum translations of the Hebrew Bible), liturgy, and morality.

The main distinction of the Early Christian community from its Jewish roots was the belief that Jesus was the long-awaited Messiah, as in the Confession of Peter, but that in itself would not have severed the Jewish connection. Another point of divergence was the questioning by Christians of the continuing applicability of the Law of Moses (the Torah), though the Apostolic Decree of the Apostolic Age of Christianity appears to parallel the Noahide Law of Judaism. The two issues came to be linked in a theological discussion within the Christian community as to whether the coming of the Messiah (First or Second Coming) annulled either some (Supersessionism), or all (Abrogation of Old Covenant laws), of the Judaic laws in what came to be called a New Covenant.

The circumcision controversy was probably the second issue (after the issue of Jesus as messiah) during which the theological argument was conducted in terms of anti-Judaism, with those who argued for the view that biblical law continued to be applicable being labelled "Judaizers" or "Pharisees" (e.g. ). The teachings of Paul (d. ~67 CE), whose letters comprise much of the New Testament demonstrate a "long battle against Judaizing." However, James the Just, who after Jesus's death was widely acknowledged as the leader of the Jerusalem Christians, worshiped at the Second Temple in Jerusalem until his death in 62, thirty years after Jesus' death.

The destruction of the Second Temple in 70 CE would lead Christians to "doubt the efficacy of the ancient law", though Ebionism would linger on until the 5th century. However, Marcion of Sinope, who advocated rejecting the entirety of Judaic influence on the Christian faith, would be excommunicated by the Church in Rome in 144 CE.

Anti-Judaic polemic
Anti-Judaic works of this period include De Adversus Iudeaos by Tertullian, Octavius by Minucius Felix, De Catholicae Ecclesiae Unitate by Cyprian of Carthage, and Instructiones Adversus Gentium Deos by Lactantius. The traditional hypothesis holds that the anti-Judaism of these early fathers of the Church "were inherited from the Christian tradition of Biblical exegesis" though a second hypothesis holds that early Christian anti-Judaism was inherited from the pagan world.

Taylor has observed that theological Christian anti-Judaism "emerge[d] from the church's efforts to resolve the contradictions inherent in its simultaneous appropriation and rejection of different elements of the Jewish tradition."

Modern scholars believe that Judaism may have been a missionary religion in the early centuries of the Christian or common era, converting so-called proselytes, and thus competition for the religious loyalties of gentiles drove anti-Judaism. The debate and dialogue moved from polemic to bitter verbal and written attacks one against the other. However, since the last decades of the 20th century,  the view that a proselytizing struggle between turn of the era Judaism and early Christianity may have been the main generator of anti-Jewish attitudes among early gentile believers in Jesus is eroding. Scholars have revisited the traditional claims about Jewish proselytizing and have largely concluded that active Jewish proselytizing was a later apologetic construct that does not reflect the reality of first century Judaism.

To Tarfon (died 135 CE) is attributed a statement about whether scrolls could be left to burn in a fire on the Sabbath. A disputed interpretation identifies these books with the Gospels (see Gilyonim): "The Gospels must be burned for paganism is not as dangerous to the Jewish faith as Jewish Christian sects." The anonymous Letter to Diognetus was the earliest apologetic work in the early Church to address Judaism. Saint Justin Martyr (died 165 CE) wrote the apologetic Dialogue with Trypho, a polemical debate giving the Christian assertions for the Messiahship of Jesus  by making use of the Old Testament contrasted with counter-arguments from a fictionalized version of Tarphon. "For centuries defenders of Christ and the enemies of the Jews employed no other method" than these apologetics. Apologetics were difficult as gentile converts could not be expected to understand Hebrew; translations of the Septuagint into Greek prior to Aquila would serve as a flawed basis for such cross-cultural arguments, as demonstrated by Origen's difficulties debating Rabbi Simlai.

Though Emperor Hadrian was an "enemy of the synagogue", the reign of Antonius began a period of Roman benevolence toward the Jewish faith. Meanwhile, imperial hostility toward Christianity continued to crystallize; after Decius, the empire was at war with it. An unequal power relationship between Jews and Christians in the context of the Greco-Roman world generated anti-Jewish feelings among the early Christians. Feelings of mutual hatred arose, driven in part by Judaism's legality in the Roman Empire; in Antioch, where the rivalry was most bitter, Jews most likely demanded the execution of Polycarp.

From Constantine to the 8th century

When Constantine and Licinius were issuing the Edict of Milan, the influence of Judaism was fading in the Land of Israel (in favor of Christianity) and seeing a rebirth outside the Roman Empire in Babylonia. By the 3rd century the Judaizing heresies were nearly extinct in Christianity.

After his defeat of Licinius in 323 CE, Constantine showed Christians marked political preference. He repressed Jewish proselytism and forbade Jews from circumcising their slaves. Jews were barred from Jerusalem except on the anniversary of the Second Temple's destruction (Tisha B'Av) and then only after paying a special tax (probably the Fiscus Judaicus) in silver. He also promulgated a law which condemned to the stake Jews who persecuted their apostates by stoning. Christianity became the state religion of the Roman Empire (see Christendom). "No sooner was [the Church] armed than it forgot its most elementary principles, and directed the secular arm against its enemies." Animosity existed on both sides, and in 351 the Jews of Palestine revolted against Constantine's son in the Jewish revolt against Constantius Gallus.

From the middle of the 5th century, apologetics ceased with Cyril of Alexandria. This form of anti-Judaism had proven futile and often served to strengthen Jewish faith. With Christianity ascendant in the Empire, the "Fathers, the bishops, and the priest who had to contend against the Jews treated them very badly. Hosius in Spain; Pope Sylvester I; Eusebius of Caesaria call them 'a perverse, dangerous, and criminal sect. While Gregory of Nyssa merely reproaches Jews as infidels, other teachers are more vehement. Saint Augustine labels the Talmudists as falsifiers; Saint Ambrose recycled the earlier anti-Christian trope and accuses Jews of despising Roman law. Saint Jerome claims Jews were possessed by an impure spirit. Saint Cyril of Jerusalem claimed the Jewish Patriarchs, or Nasi, were a low race.

All these theological and polemical attacks combined in Saint John Chrysostom's six sermons delivered at Antioch. Chrysostom, an archbishop of Constantinople, (died 407 CE) is very negative in his treatment of Judaism, though much more hyperbolic in expression. While Saint Justin's Dialogue is a philosophical treatise, Saint Chrysostom's homilies Against the Jews are a more informal and rhetorically forceful set of sermons preached in church.  Delivered while Chrysostom was still a priest in Antioch, his homilies deliver a scathing critique of Jewish religious and civil life, warning Christians not to have any contact with Judaism or the synagogue and to keep away from the rival religion's festivals.

"There are legions of theologians, historians and writers who write about the Jews the same as Chrysostom: Epiphanius, Diodorus of Tarsus, Theodore of Mopsuestia, Theodoret of Cyprus, Cosmas Indicopleustes, Athanasius the Sinaite among the Greeks; Hilarius of Poitiers, Prudentius, Paulus Orosius, Sulpicius Severus, Gennadius, Venantius Fortunatus, Isidore of Seville, among the Latins."

From the 4th to 7th centuries, while the bishops opposed Judaism in writing,  the Empire enacted a variety of civil laws against Jews, such as forbidding them from holding public office, and an oppressive curial tax. Laws were enacted to harass their free observance of religion; Justinian went so far as to enact a law against Jewish daily prayers. Both Christians and Jews engaged in recorded mob violence in the waning days of the Empire.

Through this period Jewish revolts continued. During the Byzantine–Sasanian War of 602–628 many Jews sided against the Byzantine Empire in the Jewish revolt against Heraclius, which successfully assisted the invading Persian Sassanids in conquering all of Roman Egypt and Syria. In reaction to this further anti-Jewish measures were enacted throughout the Byzantine realm and as far away as Merovingian France. Soon thereafter, 634, the Muslim conquests began, during which many Jews initially rose up again against their Byzantine rulers.

The pattern wherein Jews were relatively free under pagan rulers until the Christian conversion of the leadership, as seen with Constantine, would be repeated in the lands beyond the now collapsed Roman Empire. Sigismund of Burgundy enacted laws against Jews after coming to the throne after his conversion in 514; likewise after the conversion of Reccared, king of the Visigoths in 589, which would have lasting effect when codified by Reccesuinth in the Visigothic Code of Law. This code inspired Jews to aid Tariq ibn-Ziyad (a Muslim) in his overthrow of Roderick, and under the Moors (also Muslims), Jews regained their usurped religious freedoms.

After the 8th century
Beginning with the 8th century, legislation against heresies grew more severe. The Church, once confining itself to only the powers of canon law, increasingly appealed to secular powers. Heretics such as the Vaudois, Albigenses, Beghards, Apostolic Brothers, and Luciferians were thus "treated with cruelty" which culminated in the 13th century establishment of the Inquisition by Pope Innocent III. Jews were not ignored by such legislation, either, as they allegedly instigated Christians to judaizations, either directly or unconsciously, by their existence. They sent forth metaphysicians such as Amaury de Béne and David de Dinan; the Pasagians followed Mosaic Law; the Orleans heresy was a Jewish heresy; the Albigens taught Jewish doctrine as superior to Christian; the Dominicans preached against both the Hussites and their Jewish supporters, and thus the imperial army sent to advance on Jan Ziska massacred Jews along the way. In Spain, where Castilian custom (fueros) had granted equal rights to Muslims, Christians, and Jews, Gregory XI instituted the Spanish Inquisition to spy on Jews and Moors wherever "by words or writings they urged the Catholics to embrace their faith".

Usury became a proximate cause of much anti-Jewish sentiment during the Middle Ages. In Italy and later Poland and Germany, John of Capistrano stirred up the poor against the usury of the Jews; Bernardinus of Feltre, aided by the practical notion of establishing mont-de-piétés, called for the expulsion of Jews all over Italy and Tyrol and caused the massacre of the Jews at Trent. Kings, nobles, and bishops discouraged this behavior, protecting Jews from the monk Radulphe in Germany and countering the preachings of Bernardinus in Italy. These reactions were from knowing the history of mobs, incited against Jews, continuing attacks against their rich co-religionists. Anti-Judaism was a dynamic in the early Spanish colonies in the Americas, where Europeans used anti-Judaic memes and forms of thinking against Native and African peoples, in effect transferring anti-Judaism onto other peoples.

The Church kept to its theological anti-Judaism and, favoring the mighty and rich, was careful not to encourage the passions of the people. But while it sometimes interfered on behalf of the Jews when they were the objects of mob fury, it at the same time fueled the fury by combating Judaism.

During the Reformation

Martin Luther has been accused of antisemitism, primarily in relation to his statements about Jews in his book On the Jews and their Lies, which describes the Jews in extremely harsh terms, excoriating them, and providing detailed recommendation for a pogrom against them and their permanent oppression and/or expulsion.  According to Paul Johnson, it "may be termed the first work of modern anti-Semitism, and a giant step forward on the road to the Holocaust". In contrast, Roland Bainton, noted church historian and Luther biographer, wrote "One could wish that Luther had died before ever this tract was written. His position was entirely religious and in no respect racial".

Peter Martyr Vermigli, a shaper of Reformed Protestantism, took pains to maintain the contradiction, going back to Paul of Tarsus, of Jews being both enemy and friend, writing: "The Jews are not odious to God for the very reason they are Jews; for how could this have happened since they were embellished with so many great gifts...."

Scholarly analyses and contrasts

"The terms 'anti-Judaism' (the Christian aversion toward the Jewish religion) and 'antisemitism' (aversion toward the Jews as a racial or ethnic group) are omnipresent in the controversies over the churches' responsibility with regard to the extermination of the Jews" and "since 1945, most of the works on 'anti-Semitism' have contrasted this term with 'anti-Judaism.

According to Jeanne Favret-Saada, the scientific analysis of the links and difference between both terms is made difficult for two reasons. First is the definition: some scholars argue that anti-Judaic refers to Christian theology and to Christian theology only while others argue that the term applies also to the discriminatory policy of the churches [...]. Some authors also advance that eighteenth-century catechisms were "antisemitic" and others argue that the term cannot be used before the date of its first appearance in 1879. The second difficulty is that these two concepts place themselves in different contexts: the old and religious for the anti-Judaism' the new and political for anti-Semitism.

As examples regarding the nuances put forward by scholars:
 Leon Poliakov, in The History of Anti-Semitism (1991) describes a transition from anti-Judaism to an atheist anti-Semitism going in parallel with the transition from religion to science, as if the former had vanished in the later and therefore differentiating both. In The Aryan Myth (1995) he nevertheless writes that with the arrival of anti-Semitism, "the ineradicable feelings and resentments of the Christian West were to be expressed thereafter in a new vocabulary". According to Jeanne Fabret, "[if] there were fewer Christians going to church during the age of science, [...] religious representations kept shaping minds.
 For Gavin Langmuir, anti-Judaism is concerned with exaggerated accusations against Jews which nonetheless contain a particle of truth or evidence, whereas antisemitism reaches beyond unusual general inferences and is concerned with false suppositions. Thus Langmuir considers the labelling of Jews as 'Christ-killers' is anti-Judaic; accusations of well-poisoning, on the other hand, he regards as antisemitic. In his view, anti-Judaism and antisemitism have existed side by side from the 12th century onwards and have strengthened each other ever since. The blood libel is another example of antisemitism, though it is based in distorted notions of Judaism.
David Nirenberg, in his 2013 book Anti-Judaism: The Western Tradition considers the allegation of Jewish impiety toward the gods and misanthropy, a core element of anti-Judaism in the version formulated by Manetho, to reflect a pathology arising in  ancient Egypt, that came to underwrite Western civilization, flowing thereafter from Nicene Christianity, through Islam and the Crusades to Enlightenment Universalism to the present day defining it as a "theoretical framework for making sense of the world in terms of Jews and Judaism."  
In agreeing with Nirenberg's analysis and conclusion while recommending the book, Paula Frederiksen presents his thesis with these quotes:  “Anti-Judaism should not be understood as some archaic or irrational closet in the vast edifices of Western thought,” Nirenberg observes in his introduction. “It was rather one of the basic tools with which that edifice was constructed.” And as he ominously concludes, hundreds of pages later, “We live in an age in which millions of people are exposed daily to some variant of the argument that the challenges of the world they live in are best explained in terms of ‘Israel’.”  She describes the formation of Early Christianity as "warring sects of mostly ex-pagan gentiles", stating that "the war was against heresy; the target was other gentile Christians. But the ammunition of choice was anti-Judaism.  
Jean-Paul Sartre's essay The Anti-Semite and the Jew observes that "if the Jew did not exist, the antisemite would invent him."
 Anti-Judaism has been distinguished from antisemitism based upon racial or ethnic grounds (racial antisemitism). "The dividing line [is] the possibility of effective conversion [...]. [A] Jew ceases[] to be a Jew upon baptism." However, with racial antisemitism, "the assimilated Jew [is] still a Jew, even after baptism [...]." According to William Nichols, "[f]rom the Enlightenment onward, it is no longer possible to draw clear lines of distinction between religious and racial forms of hostility towards Jews [...]. Once Jews have been emancipated and secular thinking makes its appearance without leaving behind the old Christian hostility towards Jews, the new term antisemitism becomes almost unavoidable, even before explicitly racist doctrines appear."
 Similarly, in Anna Bikont's investigation of "the massacre of Jews in wartime Jedwabne, Poland" in The Crime and the Silence, she recognizes the presence of antisemitism as a result of religious influence that is blurred with anti-Judaism characteristics. Bikont's explanation of life in Poland as a Jew post World War I reveals how it is often difficult to distinguish between anti-Judaism and antisemitism during this time of growing anti-Judaic ideology. Poles and Jews "lived separate lives and spoke different languages" which prevented Jews from fully assimilating into Poland culture. Jewish religious culture remained present and Jew's "social and cultural life ran on a separate track" compared to Poles. The ethnic differences were made more obvious through the obvious differences in culture which fuel anti-Judaic acts. Although Jews ran separate lives from Poles, they coexisted for a long time. "Jews, especially the young, got along fine in Polish, but at home they spoke Yiddish." Socially, Jews and Poles often participated in "picnics, festivities [together]… but Jews [were] often met with an unfriendly response from Poles, and in the latter half of the thirties they were simply through own of these organizations." Bikont believes that negative views towards Jews were reinforced through religious organizations like the Catholic Church and National Party in northern Europe. "The lives of Catholics revolved around the parish and the world of churchgoers, as well as events organized by the National Party, which was blatant in its exclusion of Jews. Bikont considers that the murderous actions towards Jews in Poland resulted from "[teachings of] contempt and hostility towards Jews, feelings that were reinforced in the course of their upbringing." These events are classified as antisemitic because of the change from increase of hostility and exclusion. The delusional perception of Jews escalated in 1933 when there was a "[revolution that] swept up the whole town... 'Shooting, windows broken, shutters closed, women shrieking, running home." Bikont believes that these violent aggressions towards Jews are considered acts of antisemitism because they are performed as revolutionary acts that were a part of the National Party's agenda. Much of the difference between defining anti-Judaism from antisemitism relies on the source of influence for beliefs and actions against Jews. Once Jews were viewed as the other from Poles, the discrimination transformed from ideology of religion to race which are shown through acts of violence.

Islamic anti-Judaism

A prominent place in the Quranic polemic against the Jews is given to the conception of the religion of Abraham. The Quran presents Muslims as neither Jews nor Christians but as followers of Abraham who was in a physical sense the father of both the Jews and the Arabs and lived before the revelation of the Torah. In order to show that the religion which is practiced by the Jews is not the pure religion that was practiced by Abraham, the Quran mentions the incident in which the Israelites worshipped the Golden calf, in order to argue that Jews do not believe in a part of the revelation that was given to them, and their practice of usury shows their worldliness and disobedience of God. Furthermore, the Quran claim they attribute to God what he has not revealed. In his polemic against Judaism, Ibn Hazm provided a polemical list of what he considered "chronological and geographical inaccuracies and contradictions; theological impossibilities (anthropomorphic expressions, stories of fornication and whoredom, and the attributing of sins to prophets), as well as lack of reliable transmission (tawatur) of the text".Hava Lazarus-Yafeh, Tahrif, Encyclopedia of Islam

 Between the 9th and 13th centuries 
Throughout the Islamic Golden Age, the relatively tolerant societies of the various caliphates were still, on occasion, driven to enforce discriminatory laws against members of the Jewish faith.  Examples of these and more extreme persecutions occurred under the authority of multiple, radical Muslim Movements such as that of the Fatimid Caliph Al-Hakim bi-Amr Allah in the 11th century,  the Almohad Caliphate in the 12th century, and in the 1160s CE Shiite Abd al-Nabi ibn Mahdi who was an Imam of Yemen.

 During the Late Middle Ages and the Early Modern Period 
Differentiation laws were enforced much more regularly following the decline of secular influence within Islamic society and external threats posed by non-Muslims.

Modernist and Enlightenment Antijudaism

Karl Marx, 1843, On The Jewish Question, argued that Judaism is not only a religion, because it is an attitude of alienation from the world resulting from the ownership of money and private property, and this feeling of alienation is not exclusive to the Jews.  Rather than forcibly converting Jews to Christianity, he proposed the implementation of a program of anti-Capitalism, in order to liberate the world from Judaism, thus defined.  By framing his revolutionary economic and political project as the liberation of the world from Judaism, Marx expressed a "messianic desire" that was itself "quite Christian," according to David Nirenberg.

See also
 Antireligion and antitheism
 Anti-Semitism
 Anti-Zionism
 Christianity and Judaism
 Criticism of Christianity
 Anti-Catholicism
 Anti-Mormonism
 Anti-Protestantism
 Persecution of Christians
 Persecution of Christians by Christians
 Persecution of Oriental Orthodox Christians
 Persecution of Eastern Orthodox Christians
 Persecution of Jehovah's Witnesses
 Sectarian violence among Christians
 History of Christianity
 Criticism of Islam
 Criticism of Judaism
 Criticism of religion
 History of Islam
 Islam and Judaism
 Islamophobia
 Anti-Shi'ism
 Anti-Sunnism
 Sectarian violence among Muslims
 History of religion
 Jewish history
 Jewish religious movements
 Jewish schisms
 Persecution of early Christians by the Jews
 Persecution of Jews

Notes

References

Bibliography

 Langmuir, Gavin (1971). "Anti-Judaism as the necessary preparation for anti-Semitism". Viator, 2: p. 383.

 

 Abulafia, Anna Sapir (ed)(1998). Christians and Jews in Dispute: Disputational Literature and the Rise of Anti-Judaism in the West (c. 1000-1150)'' (Variorum Collected Studies Series). Aldershot, Hampshire: Ashgate. .

External links
 Was St. John Chrysostom Anti-Semitic?
 The Gospel of John and Christian Anti-Judaism 
 The Spanish Inquisition – Presentation with images and videos